Guangzhou–Foshan circular intercity railway, also known as the Guangfo ring intercity railway, is a regional rail in the Pearl River Delta Metropolitan Region intercity railway system. The line will form a ring around Guangzhou, Guangdong, China. The first section between Guangzhou South to Guangzhou Baiyun International Airport started construction in 2016. The line will operate with China Railway CRH6 EMUs running every 2.5 minutes.

Route
The western section of this ring railway runs from Guangzhou South to Guangzhou North along the southernmost section of the Wuhan–Guangzhou high-speed railway. The northern section of this railway runs from Guangzhou North to Airport North along the Airport Branch of the Guangzhou–Qingyuan intercity railway. The eastern section of this railway is from Airport North to Wanghong in Dongguan along the Guangzhou–Shenzhen intercity railway. The southern section completes this railway, connecting Wanghong back to Guangzhou South along the Foshan–Dongguan intercity railway.

Stations

Notes

References

Rail transport in Guangdong
Railway loop lines